The Garden Was Full of Moon is a 2000 Russian romance film directed by Vitali Melnikov. It was entered into the 22nd Moscow International Film Festival where it won the Special Silver St. George.

Cast
 Zinaida Sharko as Vera Andreyevna
 Kristina Budykho as Vera in youth
 Nikolai Volkov as Aleksei Ivanovich
 Ruslan Fomichyov as Aleksei in youth
 Lev Durov as Grigori Petrovich
 Kseniya Nazarova as Nastya
 Vera Karpova as Literary woman
 Aleksei Vasilyev as Koroyedov

References

External links
 

2000 films
2000s romance films
Russian romance films
2000s Russian-language films